Raines is a seven-episode American police procedural television show.

Raines may also refer to:

People
 Annie Raines (born 1969), American musician
 Cristina Raines (born 1952), American former actress and model
 Ella Raines (1920–1988), American film and television actress
 Franklin Raines (born 1949), American business executive
 George Raines (1846–1908), American lawyer and politician
 Hazel Jane Raines (1916–1956), American pioneer aviator and flight instructor
 Howell Raines (born 1943), American journalist, editor, and writer
 John Raines (1840–1909), American lawyer and politician
 Ron Raines (born 1949), American actor
 Ronald T. Raines (born 1958), American chemical biologist
 Steve Raines (1916–1996), American television and film actor
 Thomas Raines (1842–1924), American lawyer and politician
 Tim Raines (born 1959), American professional baseball coach and former player
 Tim Raines Jr. (born 1979), American former professional baseball outfielder
 Tony Raines (born 1964), American professional stock car racing driver

Characters
 Audrey Raines, from the American action drama television series 24
 Cid Raines, from the science fantasy role-playing video game series Final Fantasy XIII
 Letty Raines, from the American drama television series Good Behavior
 Lilly Raines, from the 1993 American political action thriller film In the Line of Fire
 Randall "Memphis" Raines, from the 2000 American action heist film Gone in 60 Seconds
 Reno Raines, from the American television series Renegade
 William Raines, from the American action drama television series The Pretender

Other
 Raine's Foundation School, a Church of England voluntary aided school
 Raines Corner, West Virginia, an unincorporated community in Monroe County, West Virginia, United States
 Raines law, the New York State liquor tax law of 1896 authored by the New York State Senator John Raines
 Raines v. Byrd, a United States Supreme Court case
 Raines, Tennessee, a suburb on the southern boundary of Memphis, Tennessee

See also
 Rain (disambiguation)
 Raine (disambiguation)
 Rayne (disambiguation)
 Reign (disambiguation)
 Rein (disambiguation)